Bakht Jehan Khan is a Pakistani politician from Buner District who served as Speaker of Provincial Assembly of Khyber Pakhtunkhwa from 2002 to 2007, belongs to Jamat e Islami.

Political career
Bakht Jehan Khan, MMA candidate for the post of Speaker bagged 81 votes, and Ikramullah Shahid from Mardan candidate for the office of Deputy Speaker, secured equal number of votes, 81 in 27 Nov 2002.
Mr Jehan, who turned from Buner, belongs to the Jamaat-i-Islami and Mr Shahid is affiliated with the Jamiat Ulema-i-Islam sami both main components of the six-party religious alliance. Then he become speaker of provincial assembly.

See also
Buner
Torwarsak

References

Living people
Pashtun people
People from Buner District
Jamaat-e-Islami Pakistan politicians
Muttahida Majlis-e-Amal MPAs (Khyber Pakhtunkhwa)
Speakers of the Provincial Assembly of Khyber Pakhtunkhwa
1953 births